John Beverley may refer to:

 John of Beverley (d. 721), Anglo-Saxon bishop
 John Beverley (politician) (fl. 1414), MP for Cambridge
 John Beverley (administrator) (1743–1827), administrator, and later esquire bedell, of Cambridge University
 John Beverley (Latin Americanist), literary and cultural critic
 John Beverley, early name for Sid Vicious

See also
John Beverley Robinson, mayor of Toronto